Kipnuk Airport  is a state-owned public-use airport serving Kipnuk, in the Bethel Census Area of the U.S. state of Alaska.

Although most U.S. airports use the same three-letter location identifier for the FAA and IATA, this airport is assigned IIK by the FAA and KPN by the IATA. The airport's ICAO identifier is PAKI.

Facilities 
Kipnuk Airport has one runway designated 15/33 with a gravel surface measuring 2,120 by 35 feet (646 x 11 m).

Airlines and destinations 

Prior to its bankruptcy and cessation of all operations, Ravn Alaska served the airport from multiple locations.

Top destinations

References

External links 
 Alaska FAA airport diagram (GIF)
 
 Resources for this airport:
 
 
 

Airports in the Bethel Census Area, Alaska